Mirza Kuchak Khan Expressway is an expressway in western Esfahan, Iran.

Streets in Isfahan